Adamstown is a village in County Wexford, Ireland.

History
A monastery called Magheranoidhe was built in the area c. 600 AD by a Saint Abban different from Abbán moccu Corbmaic.

Following the Norman conquest of Ireland, the monastery became property of the Marshall family. The de Heddon and later Devereux families were granted control of it and the surrounding lands.

A castle was built in the area by Adam Devereux, for who the village is named, in 1418. This castle was rebuilt in 1556 by Nicholas Devereux. The Adamstown estate later passed to the Earl of Albemarle, and later the Downes family by the 1800s.

A church dedicated to St. Abban was built in Adamstown in 1835.

Amenities
The village contains a primary school, a secondary school, a GAA pitch and soccer pitch, a community centre, two pubs, a shop, a R.C. church and an adjoining cemetery, chemist, Almost adjacent to the village is Adamstown castle (or tower house), which dates from the 16th century.

The Adamstown Agricultural Show is held there on the first Saturday of July every year.

Transport
Bus Éireann routes 371 and 382 serve the village on Fridays providing links to Wexford and New Ross.

Notable people
 Pádraic Delaney, actor
 Kevin Doyle, football player

References

External links
 Adamstown Show website
 Local secondary school website

Towns and villages in County Wexford